Saint-Bazile-de-Meyssac (literally Saint-Bazile of Meyssac) is a commune in the Corrèze department in central France.

Population

See also
Communes of the Corrèze department

References

Communes of Corrèze